Agonochaetia quartana is a moth of the family Gelechiidae. It is found in Bulgaria.

References

Moths described in 1990
Agonochaetia
Moths of Europe